Jason Matthew Biggs (born May 12, 1978) is an American actor and comedian. He is best known for playing Jim Levenstein in the American Pie comedy film series, Leonardo in the first two seasons of Teenage Mutant Ninja Turtles (2012), and Larry Bloom in the Netflix original series Orange Is the New Black. He also starred in Boys and Girls, Loser, Saving Silverman, Anything Else, Jersey Girl, Eight Below, Over Her Dead Body, and My Best Friend's Girl. Biggs initially gained recognition from his role in the soap opera As the World Turns, for which he was nominated for the Daytime Emmy Award for Outstanding Younger Actor in a Drama Series in 1995.

Early life and education
Biggs was born on May 12, 1978 in Pompton Plains, New Jersey, to Angela (née Zocco), a nurse, and Gary Louis Biggs, a shipping company manager. His father is of English and Italian descent and his mother is of Sicilian descent. His last name is derived from his English ancestry. He was raised Roman Catholic.

Biggs grew up in Hasbrouck Heights and attended Hasbrouck Heights High School, where he achieved success in tennis. He attended New York University before transferring to Montclair State University, where he eventually dropped out.

Career

Biggs began acting at the age of five. In 1991, he made his television debut in the short lived FOX series Drexell's Class. 

In 1988, aged 10, he received his Screen Actors Guild card for appearing in a TV commercial for Pathmark. He later recalled in a 2015 interview in TV Guide, "I remember I had to eat a doughnut in one of the shots. Over and over again. Awesome."

When Biggs was 12, he starred in a one-off HBO special, The Fotis Sevastakis Story, but due to licensing arguments, it was never aired. That same year, Biggs debuted on Broadway in Conversations with My Father with Judd Hirsch. He then starred in the daytime soap opera, As the World Turns, for which he was nominated for the Daytime Emmy Award for Best Younger Actor.

Biggs attended New York University briefly from 1996 to 1997, but soon afterwards, he left to pursue acting. And soon he would be seen again in another short lived television series, 1997's Camp Stories. He starred in American Pie, which went on to become an international hit that has spawned three sequels (also starring Biggs) and four spinoffs (that did not star Biggs). He accepted starring roles in movies such as Loser in 2000, and others. He also starred (along with his Loser co-star Mena Suvari) in the music video for the song "Teenage Dirtbag" by American rock band Wheatus. In 2001, Biggs starred in the comedy Saving Silverman. 

He appeared in the 2002 Broadway production of The Graduate as Benjamin Braddock alongside Kathleen Turner and Alicia Silverstone. In 2003, Biggs appeared as Jerry Falk in the Woody Allen romantic comedy Anything Else. In the 2004–2005 season, Biggs portrayed an Orthodox Jew in Daniel Goldfarb's comedy, Modern Orthodox, staged at Dodger Stages theater in New York City. In 2006, Biggs was seen in the MTV reality show Blowin' Up with Jamie Kennedy and Stu Stone which led to his participation in a hip-hop recording with Bay Area rapper E-40. Biggs returned to the stage in the fall of 2008 in Howard Korder's Boys' Life at New York City's Second Stage Theatre.

Biggs has appeared in several other films, including Eight Below and Over Her Dead Body. In 2010, Biggs made his literary debut by contributing "Scratch-and-Sniff", a poem about growing up in New Jersey, to the anthology, What's Your Exit? A Literary Detour through New Jersey (Word Riot Press, 2010). In 2012, he contributed to the anthology Oy! Only Six? Why Not More: Six-Word Memoirs on Jewish Life with the self-ironic article "This is a Roman nose, OK?" (Biggs is not Jewish.) A year later, Larry Smith, the editor of the anthology, and creator of Six-Word Memoirs, would be the basis for Bigg's Orange Is the New Black character Larry Bloom. He departed the series in February 2015 after two seasons.

Biggs reprised his role as Jim Levenstein in American Reunion, which was released on April 6, 2012. In the summer of 2012, Biggs took a job voicing Leonardo on Nickelodeon in Teenage Mutant Ninja Turtles. He left the series during its second season and was temporarily replaced by Dominic Catrambone. Seth Green permanently took over the role from Biggs beginning in season 3, with Leonardo's voice change being explained in the show's universe, as it was due to his throat getting injured in a battle against Shredder. Biggs also plays the cowbell in the supergroup Yukon Kornelius.

It was announced in September 2014, that Biggs would star on Broadway in The Heidi Chronicles. The play opened on March 19.

In December 2014, The Hollywood Reporter announced Biggs was cast to star in the comedy Amateur Night. Biggs plays a well-meaning expectant father who unwittingly accepts a job chauffeuring prostitutes (Janet Montgomery, Ashley Tisdale) around Los Angeles. Jenny Mollen, who is Biggs' wife in real life, appears as his wife in the film.

Personal life
Biggs grew up Catholic.

In January 2008, he became engaged to his My Best Friend's Girl co-star, actress Jenny Mollen; they married on April 23, 2008. They have a son, Sid, who was born on February 15, 2014. Their second son, Lazlo, was born on October 2, 2017. Biggs and Mollen sold their house in Los Angeles, California, which was situated near the Sunset Strip, in 2015 and moved to Manhattan, New York City. The family currently reside in the West Village.

From 2012–2014, Biggs regularly caused controversy with his posts on Twitter, including sexual jokes about Ann Romney and Janna Ryan in response to the 2012 Republican National Convention, joking about the missing Malaysia Airlines Flight 370 in 2014, joking about Malaysia Airlines Flight 17, which was shot down later that year, and mocking the death of The Bachelorette contestant Eric Hill. 

In a 2012 interview, Biggs stated that he has "a very fucked up sense of humor" and said he enjoyed the ability to "surprise people on a daily basis" on Twitter because his real personality is so different from those of the characters he usually plays. 

He apologized for and deleted his tweet about Malaysian Flight 17; in a later interview he said that it had led to death threats against him.

Filmography

References

External links

 
 
 

1978 births
Living people
20th-century American male actors
21st-century American male actors
American people of English descent
American people of Italian descent
American male child actors
American male film actors
American male soap opera actors
American male stage actors
American male television actors
American male voice actors
American Roman Catholics
Hasbrouck Heights High School alumni
Male actors from New Jersey
Montclair State University alumni
People from Hasbrouck Heights, New Jersey
People from Pequannock Township, New Jersey